Stanisław Iwaniak (born 31 August 1948) is a Polish former volleyball player. He competed in the men's tournament at the 1972 Summer Olympics.

References

1948 births
Living people
Polish men's volleyball players
Olympic volleyball players of Poland
Volleyball players at the 1972 Summer Olympics
Sportspeople from Słupsk
AZS Olsztyn coaches